Buresø is a lake located in a tunnel valley, immediately southeast of Slangerup, where Allerød, Frederikssund and Egedal municipalities meet. The tunnel valley, which was formed during the last ice age, runs in an east-west direction and can be followed along Mølleåen all the way to the Øresund coast. Between Buresø and the nearby Bastrup Sø there is a watershed. Buresø drains via Græse Å to the west to Roskilde Fjord, Bastrup Sø drains to the east to Mølleåen. Buresø and surroundings is part of Naturpark Mølleåen.

Nature protection area
Parts of Buresø are located in the Mølleåen Nature Reserve while the north side borders the conservation Kedelsø-Langsødalen Søen is part of Natura 2000 area no. 139 Øvre Mølleådal, Furesø and Frederiksdal Skov.

References

Lakes of Zealand
Allerød Municipality
Egedal Municipality
Frederikssund Municipality